The canton of Bar-le-Duc-1 is an administrative division of the Meuse department, northeastern France. It was created at the French canton reorganisation which came into effect in March 2015. Its seat is in Bar-le-Duc.

It consists of the following communes:
 
Bar-le-Duc (partly)
Combles-en-Barrois
Érize-la-Brûlée
Érize-Saint-Dizier
Géry
Longeville-en-Barrois
Naives-Rosières
Resson
Raival
Rumont
Savonnières-devant-Bar
Seigneulles
Trémont-sur-Saulx

References

Cantons of Meuse (department)